Elton Williams (born 19 September 1973) is a South African former cricketer. He played in one first-class match for Boland in 1996/97.

See also
 List of Boland representative cricketers

References

External links
 

1973 births
Living people
South African cricketers
Boland cricketers
People from Stellenbosch
Cricketers from the Western Cape